Minninglow (or Minning Low) is a hill in the Peak District National Park in Derbyshire, located within the White Peak area at grid reference . Within the clump of trees crowning the hill are a Neolithic chambered tomb and two Bronze Age bowl barrows.

The chambered tomb (Derbyshire's largest) and barrows are a Scheduled Monument. The tomb was excavated by Thomas Bateman in 1843 and 1851 and was described by Nikolaus Pevsner as "one of the most impressive of Derbyshire's surviving prehistoric burials". The barrow is considered to be a multi-period site, the oldest chamber dating from the Early Neolithic period but with other finds indicating use in the Late Neolithic or early Bronze Age, and also the Roman period. The two bowl barrows, also excavated by Bateman, date from the Bronze Age and also show signs of Roman disturbance.

Although it is within  of the High Peak Trail between Parwich and Longcliffe, there is no public right of way to the site. Since 31 January 2007, however, concessionary access has been granted by the landowner, allowing the public to walk to and explore the site.  The concessionary path from the High Peak Trail is signposted with a wooden sign similar to a public footpath sign and there are wooden markers on the route to the barrow.

About one kilometre northwest of Minninglow hill is the massive Minninglow Embankment on the former Cromford and High Peak Railway, the trackbed of which now forms the High Peak Trail. This Grade-II-listed structure, constructed from local limestone and earth in the 1820s, is a pre-Victorian example of civil engineering on the grand scale. There is access from the car park and picnic site about  further along the High Peak Trail at grid reference .

References

External links
Photos and commentary relating to the Neolithic site at The Modern Antiquarian.com

Mountains and hills of the Peak District